Gertie Huddleston (1916/1933–2013) was an contemporary Indigenous Australian artist who worked  in the Ngukurr community.

Early life and influences
Gertie Huddleston's date of birth is uncertain, and estimates range from 1916 to 1933. She was born and raised at the Roper River Mission, now the Ngukurr community, an Anglican mission in Southern Arnhem Land. Her Warndarrang and Mara heritage stems from her father, while her Ngandi and Yugul heritage stems from her mother. Her upbringing at the mission, along with her parents' beliefs, influenced Huddleston's Christian faith, and her work addressed both her faith and her roots in Aboriginal culture. Her time spent at the mission enlarged her knowledge of gardening and caring for the landscape, and she spoke highly of her time spent working on the mission gardens with her family. Mission gardens are a recurring theme in Huddleston's paintings, focusing on the use of the natural landscape, depicting scenes of abundance in the context of human control.

Huddleston's father as well as her fiancé, Bill Huddleston, served as soldiers in World War II. Bill and Gertie were married shortly after the end of the war, and moved to the Roper Valley Cattle Station, about  outside of Ngukurr. Huddleston worked as a cook there for almost a decade before moving back to Ngukurr in the late 1960s.

Career
Huddleston left Ngukurr in 1982 to move to Darwin for her daughter, who was a patient in a hospital for several weeks, before travelling and exploring Arnhem Land and Central Australia. Images from these travels, including Gunbalanya, the Flinders Range and the deserts appear in a few of her paintings, including the 1996 piece Different Landscapes around Ngukurr. Describing one of the panels in this piece, Huddleston noted that "...me and my sisters and my brothers and my daddy and mummy. We were travelling all over when we were small... St. Vidgeon area. Like that's our country. Big waterhole there. I was thinking about that too you know when I was drawing that. We have the cave, caves where dead people died inside the cave. They bin reckon big snake went there and burnt them... and left only the bones".
Thus, Huddleston's work incorporates themes of landscape and country, family history and ancestral past, and memory and imagination. Additionally, she includes Christianity as a recurring motif in her paintings. Sometimes it is through obvious title references, as in the case of her 1999 piece Garden of Eden II. Ahw noted the abundance of trees and bushes in reference to biblical significance of her landscape. The layered bush gardens within her works give expression to syncretic belief systems. In one interview in which she described the Myall lookout, she stated: "there are lots of different trees and bushes around this area. Ghost gums, cycads, palms and many others. Lots of different plants and a lotta bush tucker. Winter-time, after rain. I am a Christian and this painting reminds me of the Garden of Eden - like in the Bible". Although Huddleston's work is not known for overly biblical imagery, biblical undertones can be read into her interpretation of landscape and country. Cath Bowdler, in her catalogue for Colour Country: Art from the Roper River, explains how Christianity informs the artist's work: "Huddleston is a practising Christian, who also maintains traditional beliefs and knowledge systems. Her paintings represent an Aboriginal world-view as well as a Christian one in which she depicts ‘country’ consciously and joyously as paintings reflect a wholly Indigenous experience of ‘country’ despite their Christian allusions and their superficial resemblance to Western landscape paintings. Gertie's story of walking between two worlds is reflected in her paintings".
Huddleston, along with her four sisters, began using a new style of acrylic painting on canvas and paper in the late eighties. Her early work was based on the work of Willie Gudabi and Moima Willie, until she was able to develop her style. This own style consisted of a rich palette of colours and intricately detailed flora and fauna of Australia. In addition to this, her paintings contained various types of brush strokes which reflect the embroidery that she learned as a young girl in the Roper River Mission. Huddleston's newfound art techniques were modernist in comparison to other Aboriginal artists. Her use of colours and choice to complement her nature-based paintings with metaphorical storytelling elements, made her paintings extremely pleasing to Western viewers.

In 1987, under the guidance of the Northern Territory Open College of TAFE, the Ngukurr Arts Centre began using acrylic paint on canvas as major medium. According to Janet McKenzie's review of Colour Country: Art from the Roper River, "The introduced materials provided an essential catalyst for an outpouring of imagery, for the development of dynamic and innovative works."

Huddleston began painting with the Ngukurr Arts Centre in 1993, six years after attending art workshops for the first time. Her work explores the intersection of natural and artificial colours and landscapes. She began her artistic career with embroidery which heavily influenced her later painting style. Brenda Croft, senior curator of Aboriginal and Torres Strait Islander art at the National Gallery of Australia, states that Huddleston "embroiders the canvas with paint" through her inclusion of patchwork, tapestry and quilting in her acrylic style. Her use of embroidery imagery and technique "links the celebration of female work with the Women's Movement and the reappraisal of marginalised individuals and cultures against the hegemony of Western art".

Karen Brown became Huddleston's art dealer in 1993. Brown organised a show at the Shades of Ochre Gallery on the Esplanade and followed by three more shows in 1995, 1996, and 1997 at the Rebecca Hossack Gallery in London. In 1997 her work was included in the Ngundungunya: Art For Everyone show at the National Gallery of Victoria, putting her career in the national spotlight. In 2000, she went on to exhibit her work at the Adelaide Biennial of Australian Art: Beyond the Pale at the Art Gallery of South Australia.

Her work Different Landscapes around Ngukurr was selected for the 14th National Aboriginal and Torres Strait Islander Art Award in 1997, and her work Garden of Eden II would win the General Painting Prize at the 1999 National Aboriginal & Torres Strait Islander Art Awards (NATSIAA).

Collections
Flinders University Art Museum
National Gallery of Australia
National Gallery of Victoria
Museum and Art Gallery of the Northern Territory

Main exhibitions
1997: Ngundungunya: Art For Everyone. National Gallery of Victoria, Southbank, Australia.
2000: Adelaide Biennale: Beyond the Pale. Art Gallery of South Australia, Adelaide, Australia.
2006: Dreaming Their Way: Australian Aboriginal Women Painters. National Museum of Women in the Arts, Washington DC and The Hood Museum of Art at Dartmouth College, Hanover, NH.
2009-2010: Colour Country: Art from the Roper River. Wagga Wagga Art Gallery, Wagga Wagga; Flinders University Art Museum, Adelaide; Drill Hall Gallery, Australian National University, Canberra; Museum and Art Gallery of the Northern Territory, Darwin.

References

Further reading 
 McKenzie, Janet. 2010. Review of “Colour Country: Art from the Roper River.” Studio International, July 7, 2010.
 Iconophilia. 2009. “The Extraordinary Art of Ngukurr,” review of Colour Country: Art from the Roper River. Art blog, Canberra. June 12, 2009.
 Bowdler, Cath. 2009. “God’s Country: Gertie Huddleston.” In Colour Country: Art from the Roper River, 46–55. Wagga Wagga: Wagga Wagga Art Gallery.
Konau, Britta. Dreaming their way : Australian aboriginal women painters. Scala, London, 2006.
Radok, Stephanie. Realtime @ the Adelaide Festival: We Are One But We Are Many. Realtime., no.Issue 36, 2000.
Croft, Brenda. 2000. Beyond the pale: contemporary indigenous art : 2000 Adelaide Biennial of Australian Art. Art Gallery Board of South Australia.
Jackett, Amy September 1, 2014. Art's ebb and flow across the Top End. Art monthly Australia no. 273, (accessed April 1, 2020)

 Spunner, Suzanne. 1998. “Branding the big art award at the top end,” 9-10. Art Monthly Australia. 
 Wilson, Gavin. 2015. “Country & Western: landscape re-imagined,” 52-53. Perc Tucker Regional Gallery Exhibition.
 Rey, Una. 2010. “Colour Country: art from Roper River,” 26-27. Art Monthly Australia. September 2010.
 Durrant, Jamie. 2018. “Spirits in the Scrub - The artists of Ngukurr.” Essentials Magazine. May 2018.

Australian Aboriginal artists
Australian contemporary artists
1910s births
2013 deaths